The Williams Range is a small subrange of the Kitimat Ranges, located on the southwestern end of Denny Island, British Columbia, Canada.

References

External links
 topographical map

Kitimat Ranges